Bichurino is a rural locality (a selo) and the administrative center of Bichurinskoye Rural Settlement, Bardymsky District, Perm Krai, Russia. The population was 1,373 as of 2010. There are 32 streets.

Geography 
Bichurino is located 15 km southwest of Barda (the district's administrative centre) by road. Bardabashka-1 is the nearest rural locality.

References 

Rural localities in Bardymsky District